The Comitato Giovani Sordi Italiani (CGSI) is an Italian non-governmental organization that acts as a peak body for national associations of Deaf people, with a focus on Deaf young people who use sign language and their family and friends. CGSI aims to promote the Human Rights of Deaf Youngs Italians, by working closely with the Italy. CGSI is also a member of the World Federation of the Deaf - Youth Section (WFDYS) and European Union of the Deaf Youth (EUDY).

History
The CGSI was established on 14 May 1994 in Aosta, Italy, at the first meeting of the Deaf young Italians, under the auspices of Gruppi Giovanili Sordomuti of the Ente Nazionale Sordi, the Italian Deaf Association. The first president of CGSI was Francesco Piccigallo, who was also, at that time.

Presidents 
 Francesco Piccigallo (1992-1994)
 Vannina Vitale (1994-1996)
 Riccardo Ferracuti (1996-2001)
 Beatrice D'Aversa (2001-2003)
 Roberto Petrone (2003-2007)
 Raffaele Cagnazzo (2007-2011)
 Laura Caporali (2011-2013)
 Antonio Ciavarelli (2013-2014)
 Gianteodoro Pisciottani (2014-2016)
 Katia Bugè (2016-2018)
 Gianluca Grioli (2018-)

See also 
 Ente Nazionale Sordi
 European Union of the Deaf
 World Federation of the Deaf
 International Sign
 List of sign languages

References

External links
 

Deaf culture in Italy
Deafness rights organizations
Disability rights organizations
Disability organisations based in Italy
1994 establishments in Italy
Youth organizations established in 1994